The Camden Snow Bowl is a small, town-owned ski area in Camden, Maine. It also features a toboggan run on which the U.S. National Toboggan Championships are hosted annually. During the summer, visitors are able to hike, mountain bike, or boat and fish.

History
The Camden Snow Bowl opened in 1936, in the midst of the Great Depression. The original lodge was built by volunteers with donated materials. Almost everything had to be ferried across the pond as the area was surrounded by too many trees. The property was sold to the town which allowed them to obtain funding from the Works Progress Administration to build a road to the lodge. Some volunteers were also able to be paid from this funding to clear out trails for skiing.

Originally meant for winter recreation, specifically ice skating and skiing, the area became prominent enough that people wanted to use it year-round. After a few winters with limited snow, a horse ring was constructed to host horse shows in the warmer weather. However, that didn't stop the snow events, as skiing and tobogganing continued to gain popularity. In 1966 the Snow Bowl received federal funding to expand the ski operations, resulting in four more trails, power transmission, and snow-making equipment.

In the late 1960's, the lodge burned down, postponing the grand opening. A new building was soon constructed, although it was further from the pond and closer to the ski trails. In 1976 lifts became functional and the area came to resemble the Snow Bowl today.

Ski area 

Despite its small size, under  of vertical, the Camden Snow Bowl features 3 lifts—one magic carpet, one double chairlift, and one triple chairlift. These lifts service 20 runs,  from beginner green runs to advanced black diamond runs, spanning  of skiable area.

The Snow Bowl is the only ski area in the contiguous United States to have clear view of the ocean, which can be seen from the summit of the triple chairlift. When the resort is not open for skiing, visitors can still ride the chairlift to the summit. The mountain is also open for hiking and mountain biking.

Ragged Mountain development project 
Ragged Mountain proposed plans to redevelop the area starting in the mid 2000s. In 2010, the triple chairlift was taken down and placed in storage. Once fundraising efforts were achieved in 2014, construction started. Every lift was taken down, but a new magic carpet and triple chairlift along with LED lights, allowing for night skiing, were in place by the beginning of 2015. The double chairlift was replaced in time for the following season.

Winterfest 
Previously known as Winter Carnival, Winterfest consists of winter recreational activities and contests. In 1936, when Winter Carnival started, festivities included toboggan rides, skating races, figure skating contests, horse races (skijoring), trap shooting, and wood sawing contests. Due to World War II, these events halted in 1940.

In 2002, the modern Winterfest was developed. While toboggan rides still occur, the weekend introduced ice carving, the polar plunge, the Maine State Snow Sculpture Championships, live music, the CamJam ski and snowboard exhibition and the annual U.S. National Toboggan Championships.

Toboggan chute 

Jack Williams was a Camden local who spearheaded the renovation and documented the history of the snow bowl. Tobogganing started in Camden in 1936 during the first Winter Carnival. The chute was made of wood and covered in ice, allowing participants to slide down in their sleds. Despite being rebuilt in the early 1990's to match safety standards, the base remains made of wood.

Volunteers partake in a slow process of building up layers of ice on the wood chute every night before a race. This is done through a "Rube Goldberg" invention in which bags of water with small holes are pulled up by hand. The cool temperatures before dawn freeze the water, creating the slide. In Camden, participants are sent out onto Hosmer Pond, which is frozen, and sometimes are able to travel all the way across the water.

Every year, the Toboggan Championships are held across from the Camden Snow Bowl. Originally, it was held on the first weekend of February, but the date has since been changed to the second weekend of February in order to avoid conflict with the NFL Super Bowl. The event has been taking place every year since 1991 and allows anyone to register, making the event more of a winter festivity than a competitive sport like in the Olympics. This is the only organized wood toboggan event in the country.

References

External links 

Ski areas and resorts in Maine
Buildings and structures in Knox County, Maine
Tourist attractions in Knox County, Maine
Camden, Maine